Dinah Sings Some Blues with Red is a studio album by singer Dinah Shore and vibraphonist Red Norvo and his quartet. It was released in 1960.

Track listing 
 "Bye Bye Blues" (Fred Hamm, Dave Bennett, Bert Lown, Chauncey Gray) – 2:57
 "I Can't Face the Music" (Rube Bloom, Ted Koehler) – 2:50
 "Someday Sweetheart" (John Spikes, Reb Spikes) – 2:24
 "It's Funny to Everyone but Me" (Jack Lawrence) – 2:14
 "Who?" (Jerome Kern, Otto Harbach, Oscar Hammerstein II) – 2:13
 "I Can't Believe That You're in Love with Me" (Jimmy McHugh, Clarence Gaskill) – 3:32
 "I Ain't Got Nothin' but the Blues" (Duke Ellington, Don George) – 3:52
 "Lucky In Love" (Buddy De Sylva, Lew Brown, Ray Henderson) – 2:12
 "Do Nothing till You Hear from Me" (Ellington, Bob Russell) – 3:31
 "It's All Right with Me" (Cole Porter) – 2:41
 "Skylark" (Hoagy Carmichael, Johnny Mercer) – 2:23
 "Lover, Come Back to Me" (Sigmund Romberg, Hammerstein) – 3:39

Personnel 
 Dinah Shore – vocals
 Red Norvo – vibraphone
 Jerry Dodgion – alto saxophone, flute
 Jimmy Wyble – guitar
 John Mosher – double bass
  – drums

References

1960 albums
Dinah Shore albums
Red Norvo albums
Capitol Records albums